The UK Singles Chart is a weekly record chart which for most of its history was based on single sales from Sunday to Saturday in the United Kingdom. Since July 2014 it has also incorporated streaming data, and from 10 July 2015 has been based on a Friday to Thursday week. As of 13 January 2023, 1407 singles have reached number one. The chart was founded in 1952 by Percy Dickins of New Musical Express (NME), who telephoned 20 record stores to ask what their top 10 highest-selling singles were. Dickins aggregated the results into a top 12 hit parade, which was topped by "Here in My Heart" by Al Martino. NMEs chart was published each week in its eponymous magazine.

The sources, in accordance with the official canon of the Official Charts Company, are the New Musical Express chart from 1952 to 1960; the Record Retailer chart from 1960 to 1969; and the Official UK Singles Chart from 1969 onwards.

Turnover of number ones
The calendar year that has featured the most UK number ones is 2000, which featured 42 singles reaching the top spot; the year with the fewest number ones is 1952 with 1, followed by 2016 with 10. The act that has achieved the most number ones is American entertainer Elvis Presley, who has topped the chart 21 times – Presley's second number one, "Jailhouse Rock", was the first single ever to debut at the top of the chart. The most successful band are The Beatles, who have achieved 17 number ones on the chart. The Beatles' first chart-topper, "From Me to You", reached number one in May 1963.

In the 1970s, the required number of sales needed to top the chart was roughly 150,000. During 1992, when few releases were reaching number one, sales of CD singles were low: songs needed to sell only 60–70,000 each week to remain at the top. In 2000, when turnover of number ones was high, tracks could often sell between 100,000 and 200,000 copies in a single week. UK chart commentator James Masterton remarked in 2003: "When record sales are high, public interest in a song expires very quickly and this creates a need for ever more new product to take its place." Sales figures improved in 2008 and continued into the early 2010s, peaking in 2013, before declining over the next few years as audio streaming became popular. Eventually, streaming was incorporated into the sales chart.

Number ones in each year

See also
List of NME number-one singles of the 1970s – the original chart source continued to independently compile a chart
List of NME number-one singles of the 1980s – the original chart source continued to independently compile a chart

References

External links
Official UK Singles Top 100 at the Official Charts Company
The Official UK Top 40 Albums Chart at BBC Radio 1
UK number 1 chart singles since 1952